Romance studies or Romance philology is an academic discipline that covers the study of the languages, literatures, and cultures of areas that speak a Romance language.  Romance studies departments usually include the study of Spanish, French, Italian, and Portuguese. Additional areas of study include Romanian and Catalan, on one hand, and culture, history, and politics on the other hand.

Because most places in Latin America speak a Romance language, Latin America is also studied in Romance studies departments.  As a result, non-Romance languages in use in Latin America, such as Quechua and Guarani, are sometimes also taught in Romance studies departments.

Romance studies departments differ from single- or two-language departments in that they attempt to break down the barriers in scholarship among the various languages, through interdisciplinary or comparative work.  These departments differ from Romance language departments in that they place a heavier emphasis on connections between language and literature, among others.

See also
 Romance peoples

Bibliography
 Ti Alkire & Carol Rosen, Romance Languages: A Historical Introduction. Cambridge: Cambridge UP, 2010.
 Michel Banniard, Du latin aux langues romanes. Paris: Armand Colin, 2005.
 Randall Scott Gess & Deborah Arteaga, eds. Historical Romance Linguistics: Retrospective and Perspectives. Amsterdam–Philadelphia: John Benjamins, 2006.
 Martin Harris & Nigel Vincent, eds., The Romance Languages. Oxford: Oxford UP, 1990; revised edn. Routledge, 2003.
 Günter Holtus, Michael Metzeltin, Christian Schmitt, eds., Lexikon der Romanistischen Linguistik (LRL). 12 vols. Tübingen: Niemeyer, 1988–2005.
 Petrea Lindenbauer, Michael Metzeltin, Margit Thir, Die romanischen Sprachen: Eine einführende Übersicht. Wilhelmsfeld: Egert, 1995.
 Michael Metzeltin, Gramática explicativa de la lengua castellana: De la sintaxis a la semántica. Vienna: Praesens, 2009.
 Michael Metzeltin, Erklärende Grammatik der romanischen Sprachen. Vienna: Praesens, 2010.
 Michael Metzeltin, Las lenguas románicas estándar: Historia de su formación y de su uso. Uviéu: Academia de la Llingua Asturiana, 2004, 300 pp. online version
 Rebecca Posner, The Romance Languages. Cambridge: Cambridge UP, 1996.
 Joseph B. Solodow, Latin Alive: The Survival of Latin in English and the Romance Languages. Cambridge: Cambridge UP, 2010.
 Lorenzo Renzi & Alvise Andreose, Manuale di linguistica e filologia romanza. Bologna: Il Mulino, 2006.
 C. Tagliavini, Le origini delle lingue neolatine. Bologna: Patron, 1979.

 
Humanities
Area studies